The 2023 Belarusian Premier League is the 33rd season of top-tier football in Belarus. Shakhtyor Soligorsk are the defending champions.

Teams
The bottom-placed teams from the 2022 season (Vitebsk and Dnepr Mogilev) were relegated to the First League. They were replaced by Naftan Novopolotsk and Smorgon, champions and runners-up of the 2022 Belarusian First League respectively.

14th-placed team of the last season (Arsenal Dzerzhinsk) were relegated after they lost relegation/promotion playoffs against First League third-placed team Maxline Rogachev. Despite winning the play-off, Maxline Rogachev were denied Premier League license and remained the First League. As no other potential replacement team applied for the license, it was decided to play 2023 season with just 15 clubs.

League table

Results
Each team plays home-and-away once against every other team for a total of 28 matches over 30 matchdays.

References

External links
 

2023
Belarus
Belarus
1
Scheduled association football competitions